Piscopo is an Italian surname. Notable people with the surname include:

Daniel Piscopo, Maltese politician and minister 
Edoardo Piscopo, Italian racing driver
Joe Piscopo, American comedian and actor
Matteo Piscopo, Canadian soccer player
Tullio De Piscopo, Italian drummer and singer

Italian-language surnames